Lady Jane may refer to:

Media
 Lady Jane (1986 film), a British film directed by Trevor Nunn
 Lady Jane (2008 film), a French film directed by Robert Guédiguian
 "Lady Jane" (song), a 1966 song by the Rolling Stones
 "Lady Jane", a song on the 1994 Promised Land (Queensrÿche album)
 "Lady Jane", a song on the 2009 EP Songs for Sorrow by British singer Mika

People
 Lady Jane (singer) (born 1984), South Korean singer and television personality
 Lady Jane Birdwood (1913–2000), British political activist
 Lady Jane Campbell (born 1959), British campaigner for disability reforms
 Lady Jane Cheyne (1621–1669), English poet and playwright
 Lady Jane Cornwallis (1581–1659), English lady whose letters were published in 1842
 Lady Jane Digby (1807–1881), English aristocrat
 Lady Jane Douglas (1698–1753), Scottish noblewoman
 Lady Jane Fellowes (born 1957), sister of Diana, Princess of Wales
 Lady Jane Franklin (1791–1875), English wife of explorer Sir John Franklin
 Lady Jane Grey (1537–1554), monarch of England for nine days in 1553
 Lady Jane Hamilton (before 1704–1753), British noblewoman
 Lady Jane Lumley (1537–1578), English noble and scholar
 Lady Jane Melville (1753–1829), daughter of David Leslie, 6th Earl of Leven, Scottish peer
 Lady Jane Percy (born 1958), British businesswoman
 Lady Jane Ruthven (died 1668), Scottish lady-in-waiting for Queen Christina of Sweden
 Lady Jane Seymour (c.1541–1561), influential English writer
 Lady Jane Whorwood (1612–1684), Royalist agent during the English Civil War

Fictional
 Lady Jane, a character in Gilbert and Sullivan's 1881 Patience (opera)
 Lady Jane Coningsby, a recurring character in the British Lady Grace Mysteries detective books
 Lady Jane Felsham, a character in the British television series Lovejoy
 Lady Jane Greystoke, a major character in Edgar Rice Burroughs's series of Tarzan novels
 Lady Jane Jacks, a character on the American soap opera General Hospital
 Lady Jane, Mr. Krook's cat, in Dickens' Bleak House

Other
 Lady Jane (boutique), the first women's fashion boutique on London's Carnaby Street
Jenny (orangutan), also known as Lady Jane

See also
 Lady Jayne: Killer, a 2003 American film